Joe Lewis (Joseph S. Lewis III; born 1953 in New York City) is a post-conceptual non-media specific American artist and educator. Lewis was co-founding director of Fashion Moda in New York, where he curated and mounted numerous exhibitions and performance events. He also early on has been associated with Colab and ABC No Rio

Life and work
Lewis received his bachelor’s in 1975 from Hamilton College, and then his  M.F.A. in 1989 from Maryland Institute.  He served as a faculty member at California Institute of the Arts (CalArts) from 1991 to 1995, and then as chair of the Department of Art at California State University, Northridge from 1995 to 2001.In 2001, he became the  dean of the School of Art & Design at the Fashion Institute of Technology in New York City. In 2004, he was appointed the  dean of the School of Art & Design in the New York State College of Ceramics at Alfred University in New York.  He became the dean of Claire Trevor School of the Arts at University of California Irvine in March, 2010 until resigning from his post after being accused of violating sexual harassment policy in October 2014. He remains on the faculty of UCI. Currently, he is president of the Noah Purifoy Foundation located in Joshua Tree, California.

Collections
Museum of Modern Art, New York

Awards, commissions & fellowships
2017 Paradise AIR, Matsudo City, Chiba, Japan
2016 Fragrance Research Fellow, Soley Organics, Reykjavík, Iceland 
2015 Fljótstunga Residency Grant, Iceland
2011 Named Orange County’s Hot 25, OC Metro Magazine
2011 Curatorial Grant, Let’s Get Lost: Polaroids form the Coast LAX Airport, Department of Cultural Affairs, Los Angeles
2008 Inducted into Phi Kappa Phi Honor Society
2008 Deutsche Bank Fellow Photography Fellowship, New York Foundation for the Arts
1998 Listed in Who’s Who in American Art
1996 Award of Excellence, Design Annual, Public Service, Communication Arts 
1995 Commission, California Towers Project, Riverside, CA
1993 National Endowment for the Arts, Exhibitions Grant, Hillwood Museum, Long Island University, NY
1992 Commission, Art for Rail Transit, METRO/BLUE LINE, LACTC, Los Angeles, CA
1999 Lead Artist, Commission, Chandler Outdoor Gallery Project, 4/5ths ​of a mile of murals produced in the Chandler Corridor, 14 artists and a local middle school, North Hollywood Community Redevelopment Agency, CA
1991 Maryland State Arts Council, Fellowship, New Genres 
1990 Mid-Atlantic Arts Foundation, Artist in Residence Grant
1989-90 Commission, Mayor's Advisory Committee on Art and Culture, Baltimore, MD 
1988-89 Ford Foundation Fellowship
1987 Listed in Outstanding Young Men of America
1983 National Endowment for the Arts, Urban Studies Fellow
1982 National Endowment for the Arts, Conceptual Art, Fellowship C.A.P.S., Multi-Media Fellowship
1976 American Music Fellow, Salzburg Seminar, Austria
1975 Thomas J. Watson Fellowship Academy of American Poets Award

References

Further reading
 Carlo McCormick, The Downtown Book: The New York Art Scene, 1974–1984, Princeton University Press, 2006.
 Alan W. Moore and Marc Miller, eds. ABC No Rio Dinero: The Story of a Lower East Side Art Gallery New York: ABC No Rio with Collaborative Projects, 1985.

External links

 Joe Lewis Art
 Joe Lewis Resume at James Fuentes

American digital artists
American photographers
Living people
Postmodern artists
Artists from New York (state)
New media artists
American installation artists
American conceptual artists
American contemporary painters
1953 births
California State University, Northridge faculty
Hamilton College (New York) alumni
Maryland Institute College of Art alumni
20th-century American printmakers
California Institute of the Arts faculty
Alfred University faculty
Fashion Institute of Technology faculty